was a town located in Higashiibaraki District, Ibaraki Prefecture, Japan.

As of 2003, the town had an estimated population of 25,479 and a density of 411.62 persons per km². The total area was 61.90 km².

On March 27, 2006, Minori, along with the town of Ogawa (also from Higashiibaraki District), and the village of Tamari (from Niihari District), was merged to create the city of Omitama.

External links
Omitama official website 

Dissolved municipalities of Ibaraki Prefecture